A hanging glacier originates high on the wall of a glacial valley and descends only part of the way to the surface of the main glacier and abruptly stops, typically at a cliff. Avalanching and icefalls are the mechanisms for ice and snow transfer to the valley floor below.

Rock and icefall from a hanging glacier was responsible for triggering the Kolka-Karmadon rock ice slide in 2002, which killed 125 people.

References

Glaciology